A number of steamships have carried the name Bretagne

, an 1886 ocean liner for Compagnie Générale Transatlantique (CGT)
, 1,326 GRT, built by Helsingørs Jernskib-og Maskinbyggeri A/S
, 10,103 GRT, built by Barclay, Curle for CGT
, 3,177 GRT, built by Burmeister & Wain for Danske-Fransch Dampskibs
, 3,285 grt, built by Akers Mekaniske Verksted for F Olsen & Co
, a 1951 ocean liner for Société Générale de Transport Maritimes

See also
 

Ship names